The second season of Australian reality television series Lego Masters premiered on the Nine Network on 19 April 2020. Hamish Blake returned as host along with Ryan "The Brickman" McNaught as Judge.

Production

Due to the success of the series, In May 2019 the series was renewed for a second season which will film later in 2019 set to air in 2020. On 16 October 2019, the second season was officially confirmed at Nine's upfronts.

The second season is sponsored by Lego, Honda, Kmart & Wonder Bread.

Teams

Notes
* Not all teams in the season have a relation (i.e. family or friend), some were paired together during the application process due to single applications.

Elimination history

Series Details

Challenge 1

Airdate - 19 April 2020
Challenge: "A Whole New World" - Each of the eight teams were tasked with creating a Lego world of their choice in 15 hours, they were then given an additional 2 hours to build a gift from their world to the world on their right, built on a barge.
Advantage - The winner of the challenge received "The Golden Brick", which they can use to keep them safe from a future Elimination Challenge. They also received "The Flash Jordan Brick", which allows a team to have Season 1 contestant Jordan be their Brick Pit runner for an entire future build.

Challenge 2

Airdate - 20 April 2020
Challenge: "Hero Shot" - Each of the eight teams had 10 hours with choosing a mini figure and making a design which would be exploded similar to what you would see in an action movie as the hero struts away as an explosion goes off in the background. The winner of the challenge received immunity from the next Elimination Challenge.

Challenge 3

Airdate - 21 April 2020
Challenge: "Fairytale" - Each team had 12 hours to create a design based on famous fairytales, each design is based on a certain part in the fairytale. The team with the weakest design was eliminated.

Challenge 4

Airdate - 26 April 2020
Advantage Challenge: "Tall Tower" - Team were given 2 hours to build the tallest structure they possibly can only using 2x4, 2x6 & 2x8 bricks, however they cannot use a stool for more height. The team with the tallest structure wins an advantage of an extra hour in the Elimination Challenge.
Elimination Challenge: "One Hanging Brick" - Teams were given 10 hours to create a design built off a technic beam hanging above their desks. The team with the weakest design was eliminated.

Challenge 5

Airdate - 27 April 2020
Challenge: "Make & Shake" - Teams were given 8 hours to build a 1.2m tall 32×32 tower, which will then be subjected to varying levels 1-10 of shaking on a shake plate. The team with best design won immunity for the next Elimination Challenge.

Challenge 6

Airdate - 3 May 2020
Challenge: "3D Art" - The teams are given 12 hours to create a 3D Art design inside a deep frame. The team with weakest design will be eliminated.

Challenge 7

Airdate - 4 May 2020
Challenge: "Above & Below" - Teams were given 12 hours to build a design on a large baseplate fixed to the top and also the bottom of their construction table. The team with the worst design will go to the Elimination Challenge.
Elimination Challenge: "Retro Rebuild" - The losing team from the first challenge will compete against eliminated team Jay & Stani, they were given 3 hours to create a retro item in 1:1 scale. The team who wins regains a place in the competition.

Challenge 8

Airdate - 10 May 2020
Challenge: "Star Wars" - The teams were given 8 hours to create a new Star Wars vehicle, they must also  pick a minifigure from a tub that gives them their side – two teams will do Dark Side builds, two Light Side builds and one grey build e.g. bounty hunters. The team with the best design received immunity from the next Elimination Challenge and advanced to finals week.

Challenge 9

Airdate - 11 May 2020
Challenge: "Underwater" - The teams were given 12 hours to build a underwater themed design that will actually be submerged underwater, the design will be placed on a weighted platform covered in baseplates. The team with the weakest design will be eliminated.

Challenge 10

Airdate - 17 May 2020
Advantage Challenge: "Smash & Grab" - The teams were given 4 hours to create a design with only the amount of LEGO pieces they can grab from the floor within 5 minutes. The team with the best design will win the advantage of choosing their build in the Elimination Challenge.
Elimination Challenge: "Night & Day" - The teams were given 12 hours to create a design based on 1 of 4 vacant blocks: residential, commercial, industrial and shared space, which must look amazing during the day and at night. The team with the weakest design will be eliminated.

Grand Final

Airdate - 18 May 2020
Grand Final Challenge - Over 28 hours, remaining contestants were tasked with building something of their own choice; yet still needing to adhere to the criteria of technical skills, story-telling elements and overall aesthetic. The Team with the most votes would win the competition and receive $100,000 AUD.
Voting & Judgment - The 250 members of the public, as well as past contestants, would judge the builds, assigning their Black Bricks (worth 1 vote) to whichever model they liked most. Completing the vote, Brickman was given a Golden Brick worth 100 votes.

Ratings

References

2020 Australian television seasons